Major General Robert Ebenezer Abossey Kotei (15 July 1935 – 26 June 1979) was a soldier, politician and track and field athlete. He was once the Chief of Defence Staff of the Ghana Armed Forces and also a member of the Supreme Military Council that ruled Ghana between 1975 and 1979. He was executed in 1979, following a military coup. He also held the Ghanaian high jump record for many years.

Sports
Kotei competed for Ghana at the 1958 British Empire and Commonwealth Games held in Cardiff, Wales. He was the only Ghanaian to win a medal at the games. He won the bronze medal in the high jump event with a jump of   He won the Men's AAA Championships in 1960. He subsequently set the Ghana High Jump record in London on 16 July 1960. This record stood for 36 years until 1996. He also competed in the men's high jump at the 1960 Summer Olympics. He also became a member of the Ghana Olympic and Commonwealth Games Committee in 1973.

Career

Military
Kotei (then a Colonel), was the Commander of the First Infantry Brigade of the Ghana army in the early 1970s. He was instrumental in foiling a coup plot to unseat the then ruling National Redemption Council (NRC) government in 1973. He became the Ghana army commander in April 1976. Two years later, he was appointed the Chief of Defence Staff of the Ghana Armed Forces. He retired from the army in 1979.

Politics
Kotei was appointed commissioner (minister) for Information by the NRC military government led by General Acheampong. He also worked as the commissioner for Housing. He became a member of the Supreme Military Council (SMC) government formed on 9 October 1975. This replaced the NRC. His appointment was because he was the incumbent army commander. He became Chief of Defense Staff in 1978, following the palace coup that replaced General Acheampong with Lt. General Fred Akuffo.

Execution
On 4 June 1979, the SMC was overthrown by the  Armed Forces Revolutionary Council (AFRC) led by Flt. Lt. Jerry Rawlings. Following the bloody coup, Kotei surrendered himself to the authorities at the Achimota Police Station in response to requests that previous political office holders report. Some soldiers apparently "later went to the Police Station and brutalised him when they got to know he was there". His assets were also confiscated to the state. After an investigation that was apparently incomplete and a trial held in camera, Kotei was sentenced to death. It is alleged however that Kotei and his colleagues were probably never tried. On 26 June 1979, Kotei and five other senior army officers, including two former heads of state, Lt. Gen. Fred Akuffo and Lt. Gen. Akwasi Afrifa, were executed by firing squad. Along with the other officers, he was unceremoniously buried at the Nsawam Prisons Cemetery in Adoagyiri, near Nsawam in the Eastern Region. He left behind nine children, including a two-year-old.

Reburial
All eight senior military officers executed in June 1979 were exhumed and their bodies released to their respective families for reburial in 2001. On 27 December 2001, two of the eight, Major General Kotei and Air-Vice Marshal Boakye were buried with full military honours at the Osu Military Cemetery in Accra.

References

1935 births
1979 deaths
Ghanaian male high jumpers
Commonwealth Games bronze medallists for Ghana
Commonwealth Games medallists in athletics
Athletes (track and field) at the 1958 British Empire and Commonwealth Games
Information ministers of Ghana
Government ministers of Ghana
Ghanaian soldiers
Executed military personnel
Leaders ousted by a coup
Ghanaian sportsperson-politicians
Executed Ghanaian people
People executed by Ghana by firing squad
Ga-Adangbe people
Chiefs of Army Staff (Ghana)
Athletes (track and field) at the 1960 Summer Olympics
Olympic athletes of Ghana
Medallists at the 1958 British Empire and Commonwealth Games